Jefferson Township is one of sixteen townships in Butler County, Iowa, USA.  As of the 2020 census, its population was 285.

History
The first white child was born in Jefferson Township in 1855.

Geography
According to the USGS, it contains three cemeteries: Butler Center, Coster and New Albion.

References

External links
 US-Counties.com
 City-Data.com

Townships in Butler County, Iowa
Townships in Iowa